Tommy Lewis may refer to:
Tommy Lewis (trade unionist) (1873–1962), British trade unionist and politician
Tommy Lewis (American football) (1931–2014), U. Alabama player whose notoriety comes from the 1954 Cotton Bowl Game
Tommy Lewis (footballer), Welsh footballer
Tom E. Lewis (1958–2018), Australian actor and musician

See also
Tom Lewis (disambiguation)
Thomas Lewis (disambiguation)